Living Dead Girl may refer to:

 "Living Dead Girl" (song), a 1999 song by Rob Zombie
 Living Dead Girl (novel), a 2008 novel by Elizabeth Scott
 Living Dead Girl (film), a 2005 American short horror film
 The Living Dead Girl or La Morte Vivante, a 1982 French horror film